Sigma Phi Rho Fraternity, Inc. is a collegiate fraternity. Sigma Phi Rho has 33 chapters across the United States.

History
Sigma Phi Rho Fraternity, Inc. was started in 1978 and chartered by 13 men from Wagner College in 1979 for the purpose of developing a lasting brotherhood.

Founding members

Courtney A. Bennett
John T. Sims
Gregory F. J. Brown
Ronald Adams
Marvin Raye
James Chambers
Harvey Greenidge
Alton James
Clarence R. Bishop
Edmund Folkes
Anthony Locascio
Francisco Pena
Leroy Reynolds
Honorary Grandfather Darren Lightburn

Membership
To become a member of Sigma Phi Rho Fraternity Inc. there is a fraternal educational training. Membership of Sigma Phi Rho is open to all sophomores attending an accredited four-year college or university. Academically, the candidates must have at least a 2.7-grade point average based on a 4.0 scale. All candidates must have a documented record of community service. All candidates must display strong character, good moral judgment, and leadership abilities. Sigma Phi Rho is a non-hazing organization. Sigma Phi Rho Fraternity, Incorporated does not consent to, condone, or authorize any act of hazing, both mentally and physically, or violence towards potential candidates as a term or condition of membership There are four classes of membership of Sigma Phi Rho fraternity which are active, inactive, alumni, and honorary. An active member has the full privilege to participate in all fraternity activities. An inactive member has restricted participation in the chapter activities An alumni member has finished college and is possibly pursuing an advanced degree. An honorary member has the rights and privileges of full membership. To become an honorary member a person has to have done something remarkable, whether it's through community service, academically or some other achievement.

Auxiliary Groups
 The Rho Rhoses
The Rho Rhoses is the women's auxiliary group for Sigma Phi Rho Fraternity Incorporated. The Rho Rhoses was also founded at Wagner College on December 4, 1980. In becoming a Rhoses there are certain programs in place in order to become a fully blossom Rhoses such as the Bud program. The Bud program starts the young women who are interested, as Seeds or Rose Buds. The purpose of the Rose Buds are to aid and assist their brothers in their training process, in addition to serving their school and aid in its development and growth.

Interest Group
 The Rhoman's Court
The Rhoman's Court is the only official group for high school students interested Sigma Phi Rho Fraternity, Inc.

The Prophets

The Prophets are an interest group for college freshman. Since Sigma Phi Rho does not accept freshmen into the "Scales" Club, this group helps develop and mentor these young men. During the Prophet experience, Rho Brothers help freshman acclimate to college life and prepare for their possible fraternal journey—specifically focusing on developing scholarly habits, character, and good leadership qualities.

See also 
List of African American Greek & Fraternal Organizations
List of Latino Greek-letter organizations

References

External links
 http://www.sigmaphirho.org/
 http://www.sigmaphirho.org/Rho-Rhoses

Latino fraternities and sororities
Student societies in the United States
African-American fraternities and sororities
Student organizations established in 1979
1979 establishments in New York City